Berberis chochoco is an evergreen shrub or small tree up to  tall, in the genus Berberis, family Berberidaceae. It is native to mountainous regions of northeastern Mexico, in the states of Nuevo León, Veracruz, and San Luis Potosí.

Fruits are blue. Wood is yellow and used for dyeing and tanning.

Taxonomy
The compound leaves place this species in the group sometimes segregated as the genus Mahonia.

One obscure and long overlooked publication created a monospecific genus for this species, calling it Chrysodendron tinctorium. The same publication also erected three varieties based on minor variations in leaf shape.

References

chochoco
Endemic flora of Mexico
Flora of Nuevo León
Flora of San Luis Potosí
Flora of Veracruz